The Mainichi Film Award for Best Screenplay is a film award given at the Mainichi Film Awards.

Award Winners

References

Screenplay
Awards established in 1946
1946 establishments in Japan
Lists of films by award
Screenwriting awards for film